Nettleton may refer to:

People with the surname
Asahel Nettleton (1783–1844), American theologian and pastor, evangelist in the Second Great Awakening
Catherine Nettleton (born 1960), British diplomat
Charles Nettleton (1826–1902), Australian photographer 
Ernie Nettleton (1918–2005), English professional footballer
John Dering Nettleton (1917–1943), South African aviator and Victoria Cross recipient
John Nettleton (actor) (born 1929), English actor
Lois Nettleton (1927–2008), American actress
Paul Nettleton, Canadian lawyer and politician
Thomas Nettleton (1683–1742), English physician

Places

England
Nettleton, Lincolnshire
Nettleton, Wiltshire
Nettleton Hill, a hamlet in Kirklees District, West Yorkshire

United States
Nettleton, Kansas
Nettleton, Mississippi
Nettleton, Missouri
Nettleton High School (disambiguation)
Nettleton School District (disambiguation)
Nettleton Township, Craighead County, Arkansas, an Arkansas township

Other uses
Nettleton, American folk tune to which the Christian hymn "Come Thou Fount of Every Blessing" is set
Nettleton Stadium, a baseball stadium in Chico, California, United States